Melodi Grand Prix Junior 2003 was the second music competition in Norway in the series Melodi Grand Prix Junior for children between the ages of 8 and 15. The winner of 2003 was the group 2U with their song "Sinsykt gal forelsket", which represented Norway at the inaugural Junior Eurovision Song Contest.

The album Melodi Grand Prix Junior 2003 containing the songs of the finals reached #4 on the VG-lista Norwegian Albums Chart on week 38 of 2003 staying at #4 for 2 weeks.

Results

First round

Super Final

References 

Melodi Grand Prix Junior
Music festivals in Norway